A kaleidocycle or flextangle is a flexible polyhedron connecting six tetrahedra (or disphenoids) on opposite edges into a cycle. If the faces of the disphenoids are equilateral triangles, it can be constructed from a stretched triangular tiling net with four triangles in one direction and an even number in the other direction.

The kaleidocycle has degenerate pairs of coinciding edges in transition, which function as hinges. The kaleidocycle has an additional property that it can be continuously twisted around a ring axis, showing 4 sets of 6 triangular faces.

Kaleidocycles can be constructed from a single piece of paper (with dimensions ) without tearing or using adhesive. Because of this and their continuous twisting property, they are often given as examples of simple origami toys. The kaleidocycle is sometimes called a flexahedron in analogy to the planar flexagon, which has similar symmetry under flexing transformations.

Examples

This animation demonstrates the flexing of a kaleidocycle around its ring axis. The four sets of 6 triangular faces are shown in different colours (with every other face in each set of six shown in grey for contrast).

Variations
Beyond 6 sides, higher even number of tetrahedra, 8, 10, 12, etc, can be chained together. These models will leave a central gap, depending on the proportions of the triangle faces.

History
Wallace Walker coined the word kaleidocycle in the 1950s from the Greek kalos (beautiful), eidos (form), and kyklos (ring).

In 1977 Doris Schattschneider and Wallace Walker published a book about them using M.C. Escher patterns.

Cultural uses
The shape was called a flextangle by characters in the 2018 science fantasy adventure film A Wrinkle in Time, which depicted a paper model with its inner faces colored with hearts and patterns which become hidden when those faces are folded together. The paper toy suggested how space and time could be folded to explain the magical travels of the story. The toy is given to the daughter by her father at the start of the movie and its hearts show how love can be enfolded and still be there, even after the father mysteriously disappears.

See also
 Flexagon
 Flexible polyhedron
 Schwarz lantern

References

External links
 Kaleidocycles: Amazing Dynamic Papercraft, Instructables
 Kaleidocycle: 7 Steps (with Pictures), Instructables
 How to Make a Kaleidocycle
 Kaleidocycles
 Kaleidocycles by the Net Method
 Free Printable Halloween Flextangle (Kaleidocycle)
 Online flextangle creator
 Kaleidocycles with 6 Disphenoids

Paper folding
Polyhedra